Ton is a Dutch masculine given name, short for Anton or Antonius.  People with the name include:

Ton Alberts (1927–1999), Dutch architect	
Ton Alblas (1940–2015), Dutch politician	
Ton Alcover (born 1990), Spanish footballer
 (born 1944), Dutch author and literary critic 
Ton Blanker (born 1960), Dutch footballer
Ton Berns (born 1946), Dutch molecular geneticist	
Ton Bisseling (born 1952), Dutch molecular biologist	
Ton Boot (born 1940), Dutch basketball player and coach	
Ton Butter (1920–1999), Dutch economist	
Ton Buunk (born 1952), Dutch water polo player	
Ton Caanen (born 1966), Dutch football manager	
Ton du Chatinier (born 1958), Dutch footballer	
Ton Cornelissen (born 1974), Dutch footballer	
 (1921–2010), Dutch cabaretier, actor and screenwriter
Ton Elias (born 1955), Dutch VVD politician	
Ton van Engelen (born 1950), Dutch footballer	
Ton Hartsuiker (1933–2015), Dutch classical pianist	
Ton van Heugten (1945–2008), Dutch sidecarcross rider	
 (born 1955), Dutch sculptor
Ton van Kesteren (born 1954), Dutch VVD politician	
Ton van Klooster (born 1954), Dutch  swimmer and swimming coach	
Ton Koopman (born 1944), Dutch conductor, organist and harpsichordist	
 (1906–1991), Dutch composer and conductor
Ton de Leeuw (1926–1996), Dutch composer	
Ton de Leeuw (born 1941), Dutch organizational theorist
 (1922–1997), Dutch actor, TV director and writer	
Ton Lokhoff (born 1959), Dutch football player and manager	
Ton van Loon (born 1956), Dutch army commander	
Ton Lutz (1919–2009), Dutch actor and artistic leader	
Ton Masseurs (born 1947), Dutch guitarist	
Ton Meijer, born Dutch chief executive	
Ton van Os (born 1941), Dutch painter and sculptor	
Ton van Osch (born 1955), Dutch army commander	
Ton Pattinama (born 1956), Dutch footballer	
Ton Pronk (1941–2016), Dutch footballer	
Ton Richter (1919–2009), Dutch field hockey player	
Ton Roosendaal (born 1960), Dutch software developer and film producer	
Ton Satomi (1888–1983), pen-name of Japanese author Hideo Yamanouchi	
Ton Scherpenzeel (born 1952), Dutch keyboardist	
Ton Schmidt (born 1948), Dutch water polo player	
Ton Schulten (born 1938), Dutch landscape painter	
Ton Sijbrands (born 1949), Dutch draughts player	
Ton Strien (born 1958), Dutch CDA politician	
Ton Thie (born 1944), Dutch football goalkeeper
Ton Ven (1884–1965), pseudonym of Ferdinand Bordewijk, Dutch author	
Ton van de Ven (1944–2015), Dutch industrial designer	
Ton van den Hurk (1933 – 2021), Dutch footballer
Ton Vorst (born 1952), Dutch financial engineer and mathematician	
Ton Vrolijk (born 1958), Dutch  track cyclist

See also

Thon (name)
Tó, nicknames
Tod (given name)
Toi (name)
Tom (given name)
Tona (name)
Toni
Tono (name)
Tony (name)
Tõnu
Toon (name)
Tor (given name)
Toy (given name)

Dutch masculine given names